Tsuyoshi Fujino (born September 3, 1962 in Tokyo) is a Japanese slalom canoer who competed from the late 1970s to the mid-1990s. Competing in two Summer Olympics, he earned his best finish of 28th in the K-1 event in Barcelona in 1992.

External links
Sports-Reference.com profile

1962 births
Canoeists at the 1992 Summer Olympics
Canoeists at the 1996 Summer Olympics
Japanese male canoeists
Living people
Olympic canoeists of Japan